No. 34 Squadron ( or ), renamed No. 34 Fighter Squadron (Finnish: Hävittäjälentolaivue 34 or HLe.Lv.34 on 14 February 1944) was a fighter squadron of the Finnish Air Force during World War II. The squadron was part of Flying Regiment 3.

The pilots of the No. 34 Squadron achieved 345 confirmed kills, all with Bf 109Gs. The unit lost 30 aircraft (13 in air combat, 5 to anti-aircraft fire, 7 in accidents and 5 due to technical faults). 12 pilots were listed as dead or missing, one was captured. Three pilots of the No. 34 Squadron was awarded the Mannerheim Cross.

In December 1944 No. 34 Squadron became No. 33 Squadron.

Organization

Continuation War
1st Flight (1. Lentue)
2nd Flight (2. Lentue)
3rd Flight (3. Lentue)

The unit had an operational strength of 16 Messerschmitt Bf 109G-2s. It was later re-equipped with Bf 109G-6s. The unit had also one captured Hawker Hurricane Mk.IIA in its possession, but it never flew any operational sorties.

External links
Lentolaivue 34

34